Frailer is a 2014 Dutch drama film directed by Mijke de Jong. Initially intended as a sequel to her 1997 film Frail (Broos), the film moves from fiction to documentary. It follows the main character played by Leonor Pauw as she fights cancer in reality. It was selected to be screened in the Contemporary World Cinema section at the 2014 Toronto International Film Festival. The Hollywood Reporter praised the "kaleidoscopic portrait of a strong, smart, very loveable middle-aged woman facing death" but found the blurring of reality and fiction rather confusing.

Cast
 Leonoor Pauw as Muis
 Marnie Blok as Ted
 Lieneke le Roux as Lian
 Adelheid Roosen as Carlos

References

External links
 

2014 films
2014 drama films
Dutch drama films
2010s Dutch-language films
Films directed by Mijke de Jong